Major General Maxwell Spieker Brander CB OBE (11 October 188430 October 1972) was a senior British Army officer during the Second World War.

Military career
Born on 11 October 1884, Maxwell Brander was educated at Bedford School and at the Royal Military College, Sandhurst. He received his first commission in the British Army in 1906. He served during the First World War and was mentioned in dispatches. Promoted to the rank of major general in 1936, he was Director of Supplies and Transport at the War Office between 1937 and 1940, and Deputy Director-General of Mechanization at the Ministry of Supply between 1941 and 1947.

Major General Maxwell Brander became an Officer of the Order of the British Empire in 1925, and a Commander of the Order of the Bath in 1937. He retired from the British Army in 1949 and died on 30 October 1972.

References

Bibliography

External links
Generals of World War II

1884 births
1972 deaths
People educated at Bedford School
Graduates of the Royal Military College, Sandhurst
British Army generals of World War II
British Army personnel of World War I
English people of German descent
War Office personnel in World War II
Companions of the Order of the Bath
Members of the Order of the British Empire
Royal Army Service Corps officers